Ana Laura Aláez (Bilbao, 1964) is a Basque artist. She is one of the most renowned contemporary artists in Spain. She defines herself as an "emotions architect", as she transforms all her life into art, depicting her feelings in her artworks. One of her first exhibitions took place in 1992, in Fundació Joan Miró's Espai 10, in Barcelona. Alberto Peral, another Basque artist, was also featured in this exhibition.

Biography 
Aláez became popularly known in 1992, with an exhibition named Superficie ("surface"), held in Fundació Joan Miró's Espai 10. In this exhibition, Aláex showed three objects (Catwoman, Pantalón preservativo, and Mujeres en zapatos de plataforma) which were between pop art and gender critics, close to the performance art that became popular in the seventies.

She created the interior design project Geometrical Life, with César Rey and Daniel Holc. She is also Girls on Films singer, and works with a musician named Ascii.disko. In 2003 she published Flúor, a book with pictures and texts where she depicted her deepest aesthetic thoughts.

In 2013, Aláez was one of three winners (along with artist June Crespo and researcher Adelina Moyano) of the Basque Country government's Gure Artea Awards, receiving an endowment of €25,000.

Exhibitions 
Selected solo exhibitions:

2007
Unknowns. Mapping Contemporary Basque Art, Guggenheim Museum Bilbao
K-stains, Casa Asia, Barcelona
Lab Project, Sarjah Museus, United Emirates
Marie's story, Space C*, Seoul

2006
Architecture of sound, Museo banco de la República, Bogotá
Bambi, Mercat de La Boqueria, Barcelona

2005
Goodbye horses (kiss the frog - the art of transformation), National Museum, Oslo
K-stains, Spanish Embassy, Seoul
Cosmo Cosmetic, Space C*, Seoul
She is in fashion, Bilbao
Black metal/pink t-shirt, Galeria Moisés Pérez de Albéniz, Pamplona

2004
Superficiality, Biennial of Korea
Hell disco, Taidemuseo Tennispalatsi, Helsinki, Spanish Culture Centre, Mexico
Signale der Kleidung, Contemporary Art Centre, Podewil, Berlin

2003
Beauty cabinet prototype, Palais de Tokyo, Paris
The Royal Trip, PS1, MoMA, New York City

2002
Sound recording room, Hamburger Bahnhof Museum, Berlin
Brothel, Kiosko Alfonso, La Coruña

2001
Brothel, Centre d'Art Santa Mònica, Barcelona
Dance & Disco, Arena Gallery, Chicago
Pink Room, Liquid Sky, Sain room, Biennale di Venezia

2000
Dance & Disco, Espacio Uno, Museo Reina Sofia
Liquid Sky, Biennal de Buenos Aires

1999
Project Room, Arco’99
Brothel, Galeria Juana de Aizpuru, Madrid; Kunstmuseum Bonn; Museum Moderner Kunst Stiftung Ludwig, Vienna; Pusan Metropolitan Art Museum (Korea)

1998
Prototype studio for an artist of the new millennium, Pontevedra Biennial

1997
She astronauts, Sala Montcada, Barcelona
She in the outer space, Istanbul Biennial

1996
Krystal y attyla, Área II, Rekalde, Bilbao

1992
Surface, Espai 10, Fundació Joan Miró

Publications

References

External links 
 

Basque artists
1964 births
Living people
People from Bilbao
Spanish contemporary artists